Cormac Bane is an Irish Gaelic footballer from Galway. Bane plays his club football with Caherlistrane and county football for the Galway senior team.

Bane was called up to the Galway senior team in 2006 by manager Peter Ford.

References

Living people
Year of birth missing (living people)
Galway inter-county Gaelic footballers
Garda Síochána officers